Spongia is a genus of marine sponges in the family Spongiidae, originally described by Carl Linnaeus in 1759, containing more than 60 species. Some species, including Spongia officinalis, are used as cleaning tools, but have mostly been replaced in that use by synthetic or plant material.

Classification
The following species are recognised in the genus Spongia:

Subgenus unassigned
 Spongia alpheushyatti Van Soest & Hooper, 2020
 Spongia alpheusi Van Soest & Hooper, 2020
 Spongia hyatti Van Soest & Hooper, 2020
 Spongia jeanbaptistei Van Soest & Hooper, 2020
 Spongia lacinulosa Lamarck, 1814
 Spongia lamarcki Van Soest & Hooper, 2020
 †Spongia mantelli Van Soest & Hooper, 2020
 Spongia muricata sensu Linnaeus, 1759
 Spongia solidahyatti Van Soest & Hooper, 2020
 Spongia stellifera Lamarck, 1814

Subgenus Australospongia Cook & Bergquist, 2001
 Spongia gracilis Cook & Bergquist, 2001

Subgenus Heterofibria Cook & Bergquist, 2001
 Spongia catarinensis Mothes, Kasper, Lerner, Campos & Carraro, 2006
 Spongia corallina Kim & Sim, 2009
 Spongia corrugata Cook & Bergquist, 2001
 Spongia decooki Van Soest & Hooper, 2020
 Spongia gorgonocephalus Cook & Bergquist, 2001
 Spongia manipulatus Cook & Bergquist, 2001
 Spongia mokohinau Cook & Bergquist, 2001
 Spongia peddemorsi Samaai, Pillay & Janson, 2020
 Spongia purpurea Kim & Sim, 2009
 Spongia smaragdus Samaai, Pillay & Janson, 2019

Subgenus Spongia
 Spongia adjimensis (Topsent, 1925)
 Spongia agaricina Pallas, 1766
 Spongia anclotea de Laubenfels & Storr, 1958
 Spongia arabica arabica Keller, 1889
 Spongia australis Bergquist, 1995
 Spongia bailyi (Lendenfeld, 1886)
 Spongia barbara Duchassaing & Michelotti, 1864
 Spongia bibulus Rao, 1941
 Spongia brunnea Lévi, 1969
 Spongia cerebralis Thiele, 1905
 Spongia ceylonensis (Dendy, 1905)
 Spongia coelosia Duchassaing & Michelotti, 1864
 Spongia conifera (Lendenfeld, 1886)
 Spongia cookii Hyatt, 1877
 Spongia distans (Schulz, 1900)
 Spongia excavata (Lendenfeld, 1889)
 Spongia fistulosa (Lendenfeld, 1889)
 Spongia fuscoides Van Soest & Hooper, 2020
 Spongia graminea Hyatt, 1877
 Spongia hispida Lamarck, 1814
 Spongia hospes (Lendenfeld, 1889)
 Spongia illawarra (Whitelegge, 1901)
 Spongia lamella (Schulze, 1879)
 Spongia lesleighae Helmy, El Serehy, Mohamed & van Soest, 2004
 Spongia lignea Hyatt, 1877
 Spongia lobosa (Poléjaeff, 1884)
 Spongia magellanica Thiele, 1905
 Spongia matamata de Laubenfels, 1954
 Spongia mexicana Hyatt, 1877
 Spongia mollicula Hyatt, 1877
 Spongia mollissima Schmidt, 1862
 Spongia nicholsoni Hyatt, 1877
 Spongia nitens (Schmidt, 1862)
 Spongia obliqua Duchassaing & Michelotti, 1864
 Spongia obscura Hyatt, 1877
 Spongia oceanica de Laubenfels, 1950
 Spongia officinalis Linnaeus, 1759
 Spongia osculata (Lendenfeld, 1889)
 Spongia osculosa (Lendenfeld, 1889)
 Spongia perforata(Lendenfeld, 1889)
 Spongia pilosa (Wilson, 1902)
 Spongia raoi Van Soest & Hooper, 2020
 Spongia reticulata (Lendenfeld, 1886)
 Spongia solitaria Hyatt, 1877
 Spongia spinosa (Lendenfeld, 1888)
 Spongia sterea de Laubenfels & Storr, 1958
 Spongia suriganensis (Wilson, 1925)
 Spongia sweeti (Kirkpatrick, 1900)
 Spongia tampa de Laubenfels & Storr, 1958
 Spongia tectoria Hyatt, 1877
 Spongia tenuiramosa (Dendy, 1905)
 Spongia tubulifera Lamarck, 1814
 Spongia violacea Lévi, 1969
 Spongia virgultosa (Schmidt, 1868)
 Spongia zimocca Schmidt, 1862

References

Spongiidae